César Batista (born 6 October 1928) is a Portuguese former sports shooter. He competed at the 1960 Summer Olympics and the 1972 Summer Olympics.

References

External links
 

1928 births
Possibly living people
Portuguese male sport shooters
Olympic shooters of Portugal
Shooters at the 1960 Summer Olympics
Shooters at the 1972 Summer Olympics
People from Fundão, Portugal
Sportspeople from Castelo Branco District
20th-century Portuguese people